Tishanka is a rural locality (a selo) in Solodchinskoye Rural Settlement, Olkhovsky District, Volgograd Oblast, Russia. The population was 13 as of 2010.

Geography 
Tishanka is located in steppe, on the bank of the Tishanka River, 37 km southwest of Olkhovka (the district's administrative centre) by road. Zakharovka is the nearest rural locality.

References 

Rural localities in Olkhovsky District